Marie Huchzermeyer is an academic and public intellectual at the School of Architecture and Planning at the University of the Witwatersrand in Johannesburg, South Africa.

Books
 Huchzermeyer, M., (2004). Unlawful Occupation: Informal Settlements and Urban Policy in South Africa and Brazil. Africa World Press/The Red Sea Press, Trenton New Jersey.
 Huchzermeyer, M., (2011). Tenement Cities: From 19th Century Berlin to 21st Century Nairobi.  Africa World Press/The Red Sea Press, Trenton New Jersey.
 Huchzermeyer, M., (2011).Cities with ‘Slums’: From Informal Settlement Eradication to a Right To The City In Africa University of Cape Town Press, Cape Town

Co-edited books
 Huchzermeyer, M. and Karam, A. (eds.) (2006) Informal Settlements – A Perpetual Challenge? Juta/UCT Press, Cape Town.
Guest Editor of South African Review of Sociology (formerly Society in Transition), 37(1) 2006 Special Issue on ‘Informal Settlements and Access to Land’ (South African and international contributors).
 Harrison, P., Huchzermeyer, M., Mayekiso, M. (eds.) (2003). Confronting Fragmentation: Housing and Urban Development in a Democratising Society. UCT Press, Cape Town.

Newspaper articles
Ruling in Abahlali case lays solid foundation to build on, Business Day, 4 November 2009
Listen to the Shack Dwellers, Mail & Guardian, June 2009 (with Kerry Chance and Mark Hunter)
Reply to KZN Slums Act Judgment, Witness, March 2009
Slums Law Based on Flawed Interpretation of UN Goals, Business Day, May 2008
Uplift slums, don't destroy them, The Mercury, July 2007
KZN Slum Elimination Bill: A Step Back, The Mercury, March 2007
Elimination of the poor in KwaZulu Natal, March 2007
Intuthuko vs Ufuduko: Yini umasipala weTheku ephoqa ukuthi imijondolo ukuba ifuduke?. Izwe Labampofu, January 2007

External links
 Staff profile at the University of the Witwatersrand
 School of Architecture and Planning Website, University of the Witwatersrand

References

Academic staff of the University of the Witwatersrand
Urban theorists
Year of birth missing (living people)
Living people
Architecture academics